The Granite Pillars are conspicuous ice-free rock pillars at the west side of the lower Beardmore Glacier,  east of Mount Ida in the Queen Alexandra Range of Antarctica. They were discovered by the British Antarctic Expedition, 1907–09, and first named the "Cathedral Rocks," but changed later to avoid confusion with the Cathedral Rocks in the Royal Society Range.

References

Rock formations of the Ross Dependency
Shackleton Coast